The American High School Today: A First Report to Interest Citizens, better known as the Conant Report, is a 1959 assessment of American secondary schooling and 21 recommendations, authored by James B. Conant.

Publication 

During his term as United States ambassador to West Germany, James B. Conant arranged for a Carnegie Corporation-funded, intensive study of American high schools to commence upon his return. His researchers studied 100 high schools across 18 states between September 1957 and July 1958. En route to becoming a best seller, its 1959 publication coincided with major media coverage, with articles in Life, Newsweek, Time, and U.S. News & World Report each heralding the report's conclusion that American public high schools could be improved without radical changes.

References

Bibliography

External links 

 Full text from the Internet Archive

1959 non-fiction books
Books about education
English-language books
Secondary schools in the United States